Christopher Ingebreth Fynsk (born August 30, 1952) is an American philosopher. He is Professor and Dean of the Division of Philosophy, Art, and Critical Thought at the European Graduate School in Saas-Fee, Switzerland and Professor Emeritus at the University of Aberdeen. He is well known for his work relating the political and literary aspects of continental philosophy. Fynsk's work is closely involved with that of Martin Heidegger, Maurice Blanchot, Emmanuel Levinas, Walter Benjamin and several contemporary artists, including Francis Bacon and Salvatore Puglia.

Career
Fynsk received his doctorate from the Department of Romance Studies at Johns Hopkins University in 1981, following a Diplôme d’Etudes Avancées in Philosophy from the University of Strasbourg. His supervisor at Johns Hopkins was René Girard, while at Strasbourg he worked with Philippe Lacoue-Labarthe and Jean-Luc Nancy. Fynsk taught at the latter university from 1985 to 1987, and at Binghamton University from 1981 to 2004. Since 2003 he teaches at the European Graduate School in Saas-Fee, Switzerland. In 2004 he moved to the University of Aberdeen to join the faculty of the School of Language and Literature, and form the Centre for Modern Thought.

Bibliography
Last Steps: Maurice Blanchot's Exilic Writing (New York: Fordham University Press, 2013).
The Claim of Language: A Case for the Humanities (Minneapolis: University of Minnesota Press, 2004).
Infant Figures: The Death of the Infans and Other Scenes of Origin (Stanford: Stanford University Press, 2000)
Language and Relation: …that there is language (Stanford: Stanford University Press, 1996).
Heidegger: Thought and Historicity (Ithaca & London: Cornell University Press, 1986; 2nd edn., 1993). 
Jacques Derrida y las Humanidades, Artículo: Derrida y la filosofía: Actos de Compromiso' (Siglo XXI, 2005).

See also 
List of deconstructionists
American philosophy
List of American philosophers

Notes

External links
 Christopher Fynsk; faculty profile at European Graduate School Biography, bibliography, articles and video lectures
 Christopher Fynsk; faculty profile at University of Aberdeen

1952 births
Living people
American philosophers
Continental philosophers
Academic staff of European Graduate School
Binghamton University faculty